Cécile Untermaier (born 28 December 1951) is a French civil servant and politician from the Socialist Party. She has been the member of the National Assembly for Saône-et-Loire's 4th constituency since 2012.

See also 
 List of deputies of the 14th National Assembly of France
 List of deputies of the 15th National Assembly of France

References

External links 
 Official website

1951 births
Living people
People from Belley
People from Ain
People from Saône-et-Loire
Socialist Party (France) politicians
French socialists
Women members of the National Assembly (France)
21st-century French politicians
21st-century French women politicians
French civil servants
Politicians from Auvergne-Rhône-Alpes
Deputies of the 14th National Assembly of the French Fifth Republic
Deputies of the 15th National Assembly of the French Fifth Republic
Deputies of the 16th National Assembly of the French Fifth Republic